The Dewar Cup Aberavon  was an indoor tennis event held from 1968 through 1973 and played at Afan Lido Stadium in Aberavon, Wales as part of the Dewar Cup circuit  of indoor tournaments held throughout the United Kingdom.

Finals

Men's singles

Men's doubles

Women's singles

Women's doubles

References

Defunct tennis tournaments in the United Kingdom
Tennis tournaments in Wales
Indoor tennis tournaments